This is a list of people who identify as pansexual and who are the subjects of articles on the English Wikipedia.

See also
 Lists of LGBT people

References

Lists of LGBT-related people